Iceland competed at the 2014 Winter Olympics in Sochi, Russia, from 7 to 23 February 2014. The Icelandic team consisted of five athletes in two sports. The team also consisted of eleven officials. For the first time since 1994, Iceland was represented in a sport other than alpine skiing.

Alpine skiing 

According to the final quota allocation released on 20 January 2014, Iceland qualified four athletes. The team was officially announced on 23 January 2014.

Cross-country skiing 

According to the final quota allocation released on 20 January 2014, Iceland qualified one athlete. The team was officially announced on 23 January 2014.

Distance

Sprint

References

External links 
 
 

Nations at the 2014 Winter Olympics
2014
Winter Olympics